Aabshar is a 1953 Bollywood film.

Cast
Nimmi
Kuldip Kaur

Music
"Chale Aao Tumhe Aansu" - Lata Mangeshkar
"Hamaare Yaad Karte Hai" - Munawar Sultana
"Dil Par Sau Sau Baar" - Munawar Sultana
"Koi Sun Ke Kya Karega" - Lata Mangeshkar
"Mujhko Hai Tumse Pyaar Kyon" - Lata Mangeshkar
"Mujhko Hai Tumse Pyaar Kyon"  v2 - Rajkumari
"O Dil Churanewaale Is Dil Ko" - Asha Bhosle
"Tere Gham Ko Chhupana Hai" - Munawar Sultana
"Yeh Duniya Soot Boot Ki Baabu" - Kishore Kumar, S. D. Batish, S. Balbir

References

External links
 

1953 films
Films scored by Mohammed Shafi
Films scored by Bhola Shreshtha
1950s Hindi-language films